Julia María da Costa (July 1, 1844, in Paranaguá – July 12, 1911, in São Francisco do Sul) was a Brazilian writer and poet. She is considered to be the premiere poet of the Paraná region of Brazil.

References 

1844 births
1911 deaths
Brazilian writers
Brazilian poets